Evergestis aegyptiacalis is a moth in the family Crambidae. It was described by Aristide Caradja in 1916. It is found in Egypt. It was recorded from Fuerteventura in the Canary Islands in 2009.

References

Evergestis
Moths described in 1916
Moths of Africa